Rass or RASS may refer to:

Places 
 Ar Rass a city in central Saudi Arabia
 Rass, Bareq, a neighborhood in southwestern Saudi Arabia
See also Ar Rass (disambiguation) and Ras (disambiguation)#Places for similarly named places

People
 Ralph Felton, nicknamed "Rass", (1932–2011), American football player
 Andreas Räss (1794–1887), German bishop
 Manuel Rass (born 1998), South African rugby player
 Murad Raas (born 1969), Pakistani politician
 Sandy Rass (born 1974), British songwriter and producer

Science and technology 
Radio acoustic sounding system
ROSAT All-Sky Survey 
Richmond Agitation-Sedation Scale